Laura May Harris (born 18 August 1990) is an Australian cricketer who plays as a right-handed batter for Queensland Fire in the Women's National Cricket League (WNCL) and Brisbane Heat in the Women's Big Bash League (WBBL).

Career 
She made her Queensland debut in the 2016–17 WNCL. She has played for Brisbane Heat since the inception of the WBBL in 2015 and hit the winning runs in their title wins in both 2018–19 and 2019–20. In 2021, she was drafted by Northern Superchargers for the inaugural season of The Hundred. She played for them in six games and scored 61 runs in total. In January 2023, she signed for Wellington Blaze for the remainder of the 2022–23 Super Smash.

Personal life
Harris's younger sister is fellow Brisbane Heat cricketer Grace Harris. In November 2019, she proposed to her Brisbane Heat teammate Delissa Kimmince, after dating for four years. They married in Marburg, Queensland in August 2020. Harris has worked as a nurse when not playing cricket.

References

Further reading

External links

Laura Kimmince at Cricket Australia

Living people
1990 births
Australian women cricketers
Brisbane Heat (WBBL) cricketers
Cricketers from Queensland
Lesbian sportswomen
LGBT cricketers
Australian LGBT sportspeople
Sportspeople from Ipswich, Queensland
Queensland Fire cricketers
Northern Superchargers cricketers
Wellington Blaze cricketers
Delhi Capitals (WPL) cricketers